Frank Raymond Vukosic (April 8, 1915 – May 17, 1989) was an American professional basketball player. Vukosic played in the National Basketball League for the Pittsburgh Raiders in four games at the start of the 1944–45 season.

References

1915 births
1989 deaths
American men's basketball players
United States Army personnel of World War II
Basketball players from Pittsburgh
Pittsburgh Raiders players